Lt Gen. Maha Tharay Sithu Kyaw Win (born 3 January 1944) is a Burmese military officer and retired lieutenant general in the Myanmar Army, who served as Chief of Defense Service Training. He also served as Chief of Bureau of Special Operations 2 for Shan State and Kayah State.

Military career
He was appointed as Tactical Operations Commander No.1 of the Eastern Military Region under Vice-Senior General Maung Aye in 1988. He later commanded MOC-12 (Kawkareik) and the Northern Military Region in Myitkyina, Kachin State. In November 1997, he was appointed a member of the State Peace and Development Council.

Burma's military establishment has a total of five officers in its Bureau of Special Operations (BSO). Kyaw Win is one of the five BSO officers, and retired with the other four, in order to make way for the newly transferred officers. He retired the Myanmar Army at the rank of Lieutenant general in June 2008.

Sources

 
 
 

1944 births
Living people
Burmese military personnel
Burmese generals